Aaron M. Quine (born June 29, 1972) is an American professional stock car racing driver. He last competed part-time in the NASCAR Xfinity Series, driving the No. 74 Chevrolet Camaro for Mike Harmon Racing. Quine mainly competes in sports car racing, predominantly in the Trans-Am Series.

Racing career
Quine made his Xfinity Series debut at Mid-Ohio. He started 31st and finished 30th after crashing on lap 43.

Motorsports career results

NASCAR
(key) (Bold – Pole position awarded by qualifying time. Italics – Pole position earned by points standings or practice time. * – Most laps led.)

Xfinity Series

 Season still in progress
 Ineligible for series points

References

External links
 

1972 births
NASCAR drivers
Living people

People from Medina, Ohio
Racing drivers from Ohio